Callum Paul Johnson (born 20 August 1985) is a former British professional boxer who challenged once for the IBF light-heavyweight title in 2018. At regional level, he held the Commonwealth light-heavyweight title from 2016 to 2018 and the British light-heavyweight title in 2018. As an amateur, he won a gold medal whilst representing Scotland at the 2010 Commonwealth Games in Delhi.

Amateur career
Callum began boxing at a local club in his home town of Boston from an early age but moved to train at Terry Allen Unique ABC in Lincoln by the time he was sixteen. He fought 40 times in international contests.  In total Johnson boxed on 120 occasions as an amateur winning 95.

Despite being English and living in Lincolnshire, Johnson boxed for Scotland for six years qualifying by way of his Grandmother who came from Springburn in Glasgow.  For the 2010 Commonwealth Games in Delhi he was made the captain of the Scottish boxing squad.

Commonwealth Games
Johnson was part of the Scotland team to compete at the 2010 Commonwealth Games in Delhi. Picked at the 81kg Light heavyweight category Johnson fought his way to the final beating the likes of Krystian Borucki of the Isle of Man in his first bout, defeating British number one Obed Mbwakongo representing England 6–2 in the quarter finals and stopping Jermaine Asare of Wales in the semi's. In the final he claimed the gold medal with an 8–1 win over Northern Ireland's Thomas McCarthy.

Speaking of his win Johnson said that he needed to keep his concentration following the attempts of his teammate Steve Simmons trying to play the Flower of Scotland on a Vuvuzela during the last 3 minutes of the fight. He said "I could hear Stevie, and, to be honest, in the last round I nearly started singing it myself...It was in my head - I was singing it in my head in the last 30 seconds. But you've got to keep focused, because it only takes one shot in this game."

Professional career

Early career
After the Commonwealth Games Johnson made the decision to turn professional signing with promoter Frank Warren and being managed by former world champion Prince Naseem Hamed.  Speaking of signing professional forms Johnson said "It's fantastic to turn professional under Frank Warren who is the man to guide me to achieve my dream, to become world champion."

The decision to join Warren's stable of boxers meant that Johnson joined the likes of other former Commonwealth Games gold medalists to have turned pro with Warren including Scotsman Alex Arthur who won gold in 1998 and Stephen Smith, Jamie Cox and Don Broadhurst all of whom won gold in 2006.

Speaking of his decision to go into boxing management Naseem Hamed claimed that boxing had become "downtrodden" Johnson would add a bit of "sparkle" to the sport saying "Callum Johnson is going to be the guy to put that in. He is going to be the best breath of fresh air boxing can have." He added "I think his first ten fights will be ten knockouts and he'll be world champion within three years."

Johnson vs. Townley 
On 4 December 2010, Johnson made his professional debut at the Braehead Arena in Glasgow boxing on the undercard of Ricky Burns world title defence against Andreas Evenson. The fight against Phillip Townley was stopped in the second round, handing Townley his first stoppage defeat and a first win for Johnson.

Speaking of the nature of the victory, Naseem Hamed said "This guy's got dynamite in his hands...I just feel that he is so explosive, so chilling. He throws his punches so correctly. That is one of the reasons I got involved with Callum Johnson."

Johnson vs. Meikle 
His second fight took place on 14 March 2011, in which he faced Jody Meikle. The fight went on to the final stage and was won by points (40-35 to Callum). This marked his second victory in 2 professional fights, keeping his record as a 100% win.

Johnson vs. Beterbiev 
On 6 October 2018 Johnson challenged Artur Beterbiev for his IBF world light heavyweight title. Johnson, an underdog in the fight, managed to drop Beterbiev in the second round with a left hook. Beterbiev, however, recovered quick and dropped Johnson in the fourth round with a big right hand, forcing the referee to stop the fight.

Johnson vs. Monaghan 
In his next bout, Johnson fought Sean Monaghan, who was ranked #13 by the WBC at light heavyweight. Johnson won the fight in the third round via TKO.

Johnson vs. Markic 
In his following bout, Johnson fought and defeated WBO #15 Emil Markic with a second round TKO.

Professional boxing record

Personal life
Callum has two sons, Corbon-Rize and Clay-Jonno.

References

External links

Callum Johnson - Profile, News Archive & Current Rankings at Box.Live

English male boxers
Scottish male boxers
Light-heavyweight boxers
Living people
Boxers at the 2010 Commonwealth Games
Commonwealth Games gold medallists for Scotland
English people of Scottish descent
Commonwealth Games medallists in boxing
1985 births
Medallists at the 2010 Commonwealth Games